Monsters (stylized in all lowercase) is the fourth studio album by British singer-songwriter Tom Odell. It was released on 9 July 2021. Its lead single, "Numb", was released on 19 February 2021. The album debuted at number four on the UK Albums Chart, becoming Odell's fourth Top 10s.

Promotion 
The lead single "Numb" was released the day after the premiere of the music video which was released on 18 February 2021. The video was directed by Tom Odell and Joseph Delaney. The second single from the record was "Monster V.1". Its music video was directed by Tom Odell and Georgie Sommerville and was released on 12 March 2021. On 31 March 2021, Odell released the music video for the third single of the album, "Monster V.2", which served as a collaboration with his fans. "Money" was released as the fourth single; its music video was released on 12 May 2021 and was directed by Georgie Somerville. The fifth single from Monsters was the song "Lose You Again" and the music video was directed by Charlie Lightening.

Track listing 
All tracks produced by Tom Odell, Laurie Blundell and Miles James, except for "Streets of Heaven", produced by Odell and Rick Nowels.

Notes 
 All track titles are stylized in all lowercase.

Charts

References 

2021 albums
Tom Odell albums